Amy Farris (October 20, 1968 – September 26, 2009) was an American fiddler and singer-songwriter. She toured or recorded with artists such as Dave Alvin, Exene Cervenka, Ray Price, Bruce Robison, Kelly Willis, and Brian Wilson. Her 2004 solo album Anyway was released on Yep Roc Records. The Los Angeles County Coroner's Department ruled her death a suicide.

References

External links 
 [ Amy Farris] at Allmusic
 Tribute at L.A. Weekly

1968 births
2009 suicides
American fiddlers
Songwriters from Texas
Singers from Texas
Suicides in California
20th-century American singers
20th-century American violinists
20th-century American women singers
Yep Roc Records artists
21st-century American women